The Subaru CB engine is a gasoline boxer-4 engine used in Subaru automobiles. It is the fourth generation of Subaru boxer engines, following the first (EA, 1966–94), second (EJ, 1989–2021), and third (FB/FA, 2010/2012–present) generations.

Overview
The CB engine was first introduced in August 2020 with the second-generation Levorg. According to Subaru, CB stands for Concentration/Compact Boxer. It is the fourth-generation boxer engine family from Subaru.

This offset reduces friction during the piston downstroke. Overall thermal efficiency is 40% due to the adoption of lean-burn combustion with an excess air ratio (λ) of 2. The injector is positioned next to the spark plug in the center of the combustion chamber to ensure the lean mixture will ignite reliably. A small single-scroll turbocharger was equipped to maintain charge air volume and improve throttle response.

The connecting rods in the CB engine are split horizontally, like those in the second generation EJ engines. The third generation FB/FA connecting rods are split diagonally (also called an offset or asymmetrical connecting rod) to allow a longer piston stroke without increasing the width of the engine, but the horizontally-split connecting rods are stronger.

CB18
The first engine in the series is designated CB18, a 1.8 litre dual overhead cam 16-valve engine featuring dual AVCS with gasoline direct injection and a turbocharger. In addition, the CB18 achieves its peak torque at a lower engine speed. Engine weight of the CB18 has been reduced by  compared with the FB16.

In October 2020, Subaru announced the CB18 also would be fitted to the top-of-the-line 'Sport' trim of the 5th generation Subaru Forester in the Japanese market; other models of the Forester are equipped with the mild hybrid FB20D e-BOXER.

The CB18 engine is also fitted to the Subaru Legacy Outback for the Japanese market.

In April 2022, Subaru had to suspend production of Forester, Outback and Levorg after it discovered a sensor in CB18 engine malfunctioned.

CB18 specifications
Displacement:  DOHC, turbocharged
Bore × stroke: 
 Compression ratio: 10.4:1
Power:  at 5,200–5,600 RPM
Torque:  at 1,600–3,600 RPM

CB18 applications
 2021–present JDM Subaru Levorg (VN5)
 2021–present JDM Subaru Forester (SK5)
 2021–present JDM Subaru Legacy Outback (BT5)

References

External links

()
 
 

Subaru engines
Boxer engines
Gasoline engines by model
Four-cylinder engines